The Cabinet of the United States, which is the principal advisory body to the president of the United States, has had numerous permanent members serve as heads of multiple different federal executive departments, along with the vice president or other cabinet-level positions, which can differ under each president. As the years progressed, some departments lost their original status in the president's cabinet, while other offices were established or reorganized as such. Unlike in many parliamentary cabinets, it is generally less common in the United States for officeholders to obtain multiple positions over the years.

Edmund Randolph became the first person to have served in two different presidential cabinet posts when he was appointed secretary of state by President George Washington in 1794
after previously serving as attorney general during Washington's first term in office. Patricia Roberts Harris was the first woman and the first person of color to serve multiple posts in a president's cabinet when President Jimmy Carter appointed her secretary of health and human services
in 1979, having earlier served as secretary of housing and urban development through the first half of Carter's administration.

Elliot Richardson held the most different positions within the presidential cabinet with four, having served as secretary of health, education, and welfare; secretary of defense; and attorney general under President Richard Nixon, as well as secretary of commerce for Nixon's successor, Gerald Ford. George Shultz equaled that record, holding successive offices in the Nixon administration, first as secretary of labor, then in the cabinet-rank position of director of the Office of Management and Budget, and finally as secretary of the treasury, before being appointed secretary of state under President Ronald Reagan.

List of multiple cabinet-level officeholders
The following list includes people who have lead two or more different executive departments or other cabinet-level offices, which can vary under each president. The table below is organized by date of second appointment or election to such a position. Officeholders whose terms begin the same day are ranked alphabetically by last name.

Former permanent Cabinet members 
 The Secretary of War became defunct when the Department of War was split between the Department of the Army and the Department of the Air Force by the National Security Act of 1947, and both were absorbed into the Department of Defense in 1949.
 The Postmaster General ceased to be a member of the Cabinet when the Post Office Department was re-organized into the United States Postal Service (USPS) by the Postal Reorganization Act, a special agency independent of the executive branch.
 The Secretary of the Army, Secretary of the Navy, and the Secretary of the Air Force ceased to be members of the Cabinet when their particular departments was absorbed into the Department of Defense in 1949.

See also
 Cabinet reshuffle
 List of people who have served in all three branches of the United States federal government

Notes

References

External links
The Cabinet - Provided by the White House. Retrieved  March 23, 2022.

Multiple Cabinet
+